Inger Maria Alfvén (24 February 1940 – 26 July 2022) was a Swedish author and sociologist from Solna in Stockholm County.

Biography 
Alfvén became a sociologist in 1964 and worked as a curator.

Her books depict existential and moral conflicts such as inherited gender roles, love, lifelong friendship, and loneliness. She had her big breakthrough with the novel S/Y Glädjen in 1979.

In 2002, Alfvén made her debut as a playwright with the play The Rainbow's Root (Regnbågens rot), which is about three sisters' lives and development during the last decades of the last century. 

Her books consisted often of what moves through human consciousness.

Family 
Alfvén was married for the first time in 1962–1980 to medical licentiate Mikael von Heijne (born 1941), the second time from 1985 to 1991 to the author Lars-Olof Franzén (born 1936), and the third time from 1993 to the psychiatrist Johan Cullberg (born 1934).

She was a daughter of physics professor and Nobel laureate Hannes Alfvén and a grandniece of composer Hugo Alfvén.

Works

Writing 

 1964 – Vinbergssnäckan
 1969 – Tusentals äpplen
 1971 – Lena-Bell
 1972 – Ta ner månen
 1976 – Städpatrullen
 1977 – Dotter till en dotter
 1979 – S/Y Glädjen (filmed in 1989)
 1981 – Arvedelen
 1984 – Ur kackerlackors levnad
 1986 – Lyckans galosch
 1989 – Judiths teater (also filmed as a TV series, Judith)
 1992 – Elefantens öga
 1992 – Kvinnornas svarta bok
 1992 – Sex kvinnors lusta
 1994 – En moder har fyra döttrar
 1997 – Berget dit fjärilarna flyger för att dö
 1998 – När jag tänker på pengar
 1999 – Det blå skåpet
 2002 – Någon kom i båten (written and filmed in 2002 as Vier Töchter) 
 2004 – Livets vatten
 2006 – Mandelkärnan
 2009 – När förnuftet sover
 2012 – Allt vi aldrig gjorde med varandra
 2015 – Berör mig inte, berör mig
 2019 – Tvilling

Producing 
 2011 – When God Is Watching Us

Awards 

 1978 – TCO Culture Prize
 2001 – Signe Ekblad-Eldh Prize
 2006 – The Nine Special Prize Society
 2012 – Moa Prize
 2012 – Eric and Ingrid Lilliehöök's scholarship

References 

1940 births
2022 deaths
20th-century Swedish women writers
21st-century Swedish artists
Artists from Stockholm